Kurt Bauch (25 November 1897 in Neustadt-Glewe – 1 March 1975 in Freiburg im Breisgau) was a German art historian with particular interest in the art of Rembrandt.

The son of a Mecklenburg judge, Bauch studied art history at the University of Berlin under Adolph Goldschmidt and at the University of Munich under Heinrich Wölfflin. He wrote his Ph.D. dissertation on the Rembrandt pupil, Jacob Adriaensz Backer, at the University of Freiburg under Hans Jantzen. From 1924 to 1926 he was assistant of the famous Dutch Rembrandt scholar, Cornelis Hofstede de Groot in the Hague. In 1927 he completed his Habilitationsschrift on the art of the young Rembrandt. For some years he worked as a Privatdozent, teaching medieval and early modern art in Freiburg and Frankfurt am Main. After joining the Nazi Party in 1933, he was appointed professor of art history at the University of Freiburg, where he retired in 1962.

Select publications
Jakob Adriaensz Backer: ein Rembrandtbschüler aus Friesland. Berlin 1926.
Die Kunst des jungen Rembrandt. Heidelberg 1933.
Über die Herkunft der Gotik. Freiburg im Breisgau 1939.
Strassburg. Berlin 1941. 
Der Isenheimer Altar. Königstein im Taunus 1951.
Abendländische Kunst. Düsseldorf 1952.
Freiburg im Breisgau. Munich 1953.
Der frühe Rembrandt und seine Zeit: Studien zur geschichtlichen Bedeutung seines Frühstils. Berlin 1960.
Deutsche Kultur am Kap - German culture at the Cape - Duitse kultuur aan die Kaap. Cape Town 1964. 
Rembrandt: Gemälde. Berlin 1966.
Das Brandenburger Tor. Cologne 1966.
Studien zur Kunstgeschichte. Berlin 1967.
Das mittelalterliche Grabbild. Figürliche Grabmäler des 11. bis 15. Jahrhunderts in Europa. Berlin 1976.

External links
Dictionary of Art Historians: Bauch, Kurt
 Books by Kurt Bauch on the Google Books Library Project

German art historians
1897 births
1975 deaths
German male non-fiction writers
Rembrandt scholars